Sam Spade was the name of a Windows software tool designed to assist in tracking down sources of e-mail spam. It was also the name of a free web service that provides access to similar online tools. The Sam Spade utility was authored by Steve Atkins in 1997.  It is named after the fictional character Sam Spade.

Query tools 
The main features (query tools) were:
 Zone Transfer – ask a DNS server for all it knows about a domain
 SMTP Relay Check – check whether a mail server allows third party relaying
 Scan Addresses – scan a range of IP addresses looking for open ports
 Crawl website – search a website, looking for email addresses, offsite links, etc.
 Browse web – browse the web in a raw http format
 Check cancels – search your news server for cancel messages
 Fast and Slow Traceroute – find the route packets take between you and a remote system
 S-Lang command – issue a scripting command; useful for debugging scripts
 Decode URL – decipher an obfuscated URL
 Parse email headers – read email headers and make a guess about the origin of the email

Website history 
The last fully functional version of the website was available 2004-02-26.
Since then it experienced various outage problems due to "blackholing of SamSpade.org by several RIRs and general heavy usage." and is no longer online.  The URL currently redirects to https://tools.wordtothewise.com/ which contains a similar set of web tools under the brand name "wiseTools" and hosted by Atkins's email software business Word to The Wise

References

External links
 Sam Spade home page (currently offline)
 Sam Spade download sites Windows client download page (currently offline, last archived here)
 archived Windows client software
 Download Sam Spade from MajorGeeks.com
 Using Sam Spade Sam Spade tutorial by Terry Pasley, 2003, maintained at SANS Institute InfoSec Reading Room

1997 software
Anti-spam
Windows security software